Brent Mydland (October 21, 1952 – July 26, 1990) was an American keyboardist and singer. He was a member of the rock band The Grateful Dead from 1979 to 1990, a longer tenure than any other keyboardist in the band.

Growing up in Concord, California, Mydland took up music while in elementary school. After graduation, he played with a number of bands and recorded one album with Silver before joining Bobby and the Midnites with Bob Weir and jazz veterans Billy Cobham and Alphonso Johnson. This led to an invitation to join the Dead in 1979, replacing Keith Godchaux who had decided to leave. Mydland quickly became an important member in the Dead, using a variety of keyboards including Hammond organ and various synthesizers and singing regularly. He wrote several songs on the band's studio albums released while he was a member.

After a tour in the early summer 1990, Mydland died of an accidental drug overdose.

Biography

Early life
Born in Munich, Germany, the child of a U.S. Army chaplain, Mydland moved to San Francisco with his parents at the age of one. Mydland spent most of his childhood in Concord, California. He started piano lessons aged six and had formal classical lessons through his junior year in high school. In an interview he commented that "My sister took lessons and it looked fun to me, so I did too. There was always a piano around the house and I wanted to play it. When I couldn't play it I would beat on it anyway." His mother, a graveyard shift nurse, encouraged Mydland's talents by insisting that he practice his music two hours each day. He played trumpet from elementary till his senior year in high school; his schoolmates remember him practicing on an accordion, as well as the piano, every day after school.

Mydland played trumpet in the school's marching band, but was dismissed for having long hair. He graduated from Liberty High School, Brentwood, California, in 1971.

Pre-Grateful Dead
Mydland began playing rock'n'roll with friends in high school (Liberty High School), and was influenced by organists such as Lee Michaels, Ray Manzarek and Steppenwolf's Goldy McJohn. He became a fan of the Grateful Dead in the late 1960s, though was less impressed by their 1970s material.

After graduation, Mydland lived in a quonset hut in Thousand Oaks, California, writing songs. He joined a band with Rick Carlos, who was invited by John Batdorf of Batdorf & Rodney to join their band. Mydland was asked to join shortly after. He then formed the band Silver with Batdorf, releasing one album on Arista Records.

Mydland then got in touch with Bob Weir via a connection from Batdorf & Rodney, and joined Weir's side project Bobby and the Midnites as keyboardist and backing vocalist.

Grateful Dead
Mydland joined the Grateful Dead in April 1979, replacing Keith and Donna Godchaux, who had decided to start their own band. After two weeks of rehearsals, he played his first concert with the band at the Spartan Stadium, San Jose, on April 22.

Mydland quickly became an integral part of the Dead owing to his vocal and songwriting skills as much as his keyboard playing. He quickly combined his tenor singing with founding members Weir and Jerry Garcia to provide strong three-part harmonies on live favorites. He easily fit into the band's sound and added his own contributions, such as in Go to Heaven (1980) which featured two of Mydland's songs, "Far From Me" and "Easy to Love You," the latter written with frequent Weir collaborator John Perry Barlow. On the next album, In the Dark (1987), Mydland co-wrote "Hell in a Bucket" with Weir and Barlow; he also penned the train song "Tons of Steel".

Built to Last (1989) featured several more of Mydland's songs: the moody "Just a Little Light", the environmental song "We Can Run," the live-performance-driven "Blow Away" and the poignant "I Will Take You Home," a lullaby written with Barlow for Mydland's two daughters.

Mydland wrote several other songs that were played live but not released on any studio albums, including "Don't Need Love," "Never Trust A Woman," "Maybe You Know," "Only a Fool," all written solo, and "Gentlemen Start Your Engines," with Barlow. Many of these were intended for a solo album that was started but never completed, along with "Love Doesn't Have to be Pretty," performed live solo, but not with the Grateful Dead. He also co-wrote "Revolutionary Hamstrung Blues" with Phil Lesh and Lesh's lyrical collaborator Bobby Petersen, although the song was performed live only once.

His high, gravelly vocal harmonies and emotional leads added to the band's singing strength, and he even occasionally incorporated scat singing into his solos. Monty Byrom, guitarist on Mydland's unreleased solo album said Mydland was "one of the most talented guys I've ever met. I've never seen anybody that could sing with those kind of notes, night after night. He was a cross between Gregg Allman and Howlin' Wolf. It was crazy." Mydland's vocals added color to old favorites such as "Cassidy," "Mississippi Half-Step Uptown Toodeloo," "Ramble on Rose," the Band's "The Weight", and he even wrote his own verse for Willie Dixon's "Little Red Rooster". He sang lead on many covers, including Traffic's "Dear Mr. Fantasy", the Beatles' "Hey Jude", and the Meters' "Hey Pocky Way".

Mydland's last show with the Grateful Dead was on July 23, 1990, at the World Music Theater, in Tinley Park, Illinois.

In 1994, he was inducted into the Rock and Roll Hall of Fame as a member of the Grateful Dead.

Equipment
While Keith Godchaux had preferred to play only piano at concerts, Mydland was keen to experiment with different sounds during live performances. He frequently changed his setup to add new sounds. He played several different electric pianos and synthesizers throughout his tenure. Upon joining the band in 1979, his piano sounds came from a Fender Rhodes. In 1982, he switched to a Yamaha CP-70 electric grand, though he only used it for about one year. During this time he also used analog synthesizers including a Minimoog, and a Sequential Circuits Prophet-5. In 1983, he replaced his analog synthesizers and electric piano with a Yamaha GS-1 digital piano. The GS-1 is an extremely rare synthesizer, with only about 100 ever produced. In the mid-eighties, he also added an E-mu Emulator II to his rig. 

In mid 1987, Mydland's synthesizer setup changed once again. Bob Bralove had been hired by the Grateful Dead to program and maintain new MIDI systems. The GS-1 and Emulator II were replaced by a new Kurzweil MIDIboard MIDI controller, which gave Mydland the ability to use voices from an array of different synthesizer modules, and blend them together using volume pedals and foot switches. The MIDIboard, like the GS-1 it replaced, was capable of polyphonic aftertouch, a relatively rare feature in MIDI controllers. The synthesizer racks included a Roland MKS20 digital piano, a Kurzweil 250RMX (the rack-mounted version of the famous Kurzweil K250 synthesizer), a Roland S550 sampler, a Lexicon PCM41 digital delay, a Lexicon PCM70 reverb/effects processor, and an Akai mixing board.
A Roland D-50 keyboard was added in the fall of 1987, and a Korg M1 keyboard was added in the fall of 1989 after experimenting with the M1R module version on the 1989 summer tour. These keyboards could be played independently as well as controlled through the MIDIboard. 

Mydland regularly played the Hammond organ, and had a B-3 with ten modified Leslie speakers in his setup for his entire tenure. The Grateful Dead purchased three B-3 organs for his use when he joined the band, and he personally owned several B-3 organs at the time of his death. The B-3 he played for the majority of his tenure with the Grateful Dead, known for once being covered with stickers, is currently used by keyboardist Jeff Chimenti during live performances. It was present at the 50th anniversary "Fare Thee Well" concerts in July 2015. Outlines from where the stickers once were are still visible on the back of the organ.

Other work
In 1982, he recorded and mastered a solo studio album, but it was never released.

In the summer of 1985, he performed with Dead drummer Bill Kreutzmann in their band Kokomo along with 707's Kevin Russell and Santana's David Margen.

In 1985, he performed at the Haight Street Fair with Weir, John Cipollina, and Merl Saunders, among others.

In 1986, Mydland formed Go Ahead with several San Francisco Bay area musicians, including Bill Kreutzmann, also former Santana members Alex Ligertwood on vocals and David Margen on bass, as well as guitarist Jerry Cortez. The band toured during the time Jerry Garcia was recovering from a diabetic coma, and also briefly reunited in 1988.

In 1988, Mydland performed at the Bay Area Music Awards, sharing an organ with Merl Saunders and performing alongside Jerry Garcia, Bob Weir, John Fogerty, and others.

He also did numerous solo projects and performances, as well as duo performances with Bob Weir numerous times throughout the 1980s, with Weir on acoustic guitar and Mydland on grand piano.

Death
Brent Mydland died at his home in Lafayette, California, on July 26, 1990, shortly after completing the Grateful Dead's summer tour. An autopsy conducted by the Contra Costa Coroner's office revealed that Mydland had died of acute cocaine and morphine intoxication. Richard Rainey, Contra Costa County coroner, stated that "Toxicology tests reveal lethal levels of morphine and cocaine in the blood", a mixture "commonly referred to as a 'speedball'." He was the third Dead keyboardist to die (after founding member Ron "Pigpen" McKernan in 1973 and Keith Godchaux in 1980); Garcia said Mydland's death was "crushing" and it abruptly closed a chapter of the band's career.

Mydland is buried at Oakmont Memorial Park in Lafayette, California.

Legacy
Weir has said that the late '80s and early '90s with Mydland was his favorite time playing in the band.

David Gans has described Mydland as "a talented synthesist [sic], who was able to play all this beautiful synthesized string stuff, but he could still kick ass and take names on the Hammond organ."

Mydland's younger daughter, Jennifer Mydland, is an aspiring singer-songwriter.

Discography

With the Grateful Dead

Go to Heaven – 1980
Reckoning – 1981
Dead Set – 1981
In the Dark – 1987
Dylan & the Dead – 1989
Built to Last – 1989
Without a Net – 1990
Infrared Roses –1991
Grayfolded – 1994
Dick's Picks Volume 5 – 1996
Dozin' at the Knick – 1996
Dick's Picks Volume 6 – 1996
Terrapin Station – 1997
Fallout from the Phil Zone – 1997
Dick's Picks Volume 13 – 1999
View from the Vault, Volume One – 2000
Dick's Picks Volume 21 – 2001
Nightfall of Diamonds – 2001
Postcards of the Hanging – March 2002
View from the Vault, Volume Three – 2002
Go to Nassau – 2002
View from the Vault, Volume Four – 2003
Dick's Picks Volume 32 – 2004
Truckin' Up to Buffalo – 2005
Road Trips Volume 1 Number 1 – 2007
Road Trips Volume 3 Number 1 – 2009
Crimson White & Indigo – 2010
Road Trips Volume 3 Number 4 – 2010
Formerly the Warlocks – 2010
Road Trips Volume 4 Number 2 – 2011
Road Trips Volume 4 Number 4 – 2011
Spring 1990 – 2012
Spring 1990: So Glad You Made It – 2012
Dave's Picks Volume 8 – 2013
Live at Hampton Coliseum – 2014
Spring 1990 (The Other One) – 2014
Wake Up to Find Out – 2014
30 Trips Around the Sun – 2015
30 Trips Around the Sun: The Definitive Live Story 1965–1995 – 2015
Dave's Picks Volume 20 – 2016
Robert F. Kennedy Stadium, Washington, D.C., July 12 & 13, 1989 – 2017
Dave's Picks Volume 27 – 2018
The Warfield, San Francisco, California, October 9 & 10, 1980 – 2019
Dave's Picks Volume 31 – 2019
Giants Stadium 1987, 1989, 1991 – 2019
Saint of Circumstance – 2019
Dave's Picks Volume 35 – 2020
Dave's Picks Volume 36 – 2020
Dave's Picks Volume 39 – 2021
Dave's Picks Volume 40 – 2021
In and Out of the Garden: Madison Square Garden '81, '82, '83 – 2022
Madison Square Garden, New York, NY 3/9/81 – 2022

With other artists
Silver – Silver – 1976
Sweet Surprise – Eric Andersen – 1976
Bobby and the Midnites – Bobby and the Midnites – 1981
A Wing and a Prayer – Matt Kelly – 1985
Down in the Groove – Bob Dylan – 1988
New Frontier – New Frontier – 1988

References
Citations

Sources

Further reading

External links
Brent Mydland Discography deadisc.com 
Brent Mydland obituary, 'The New York Times July 27, 1990

Jackson, Blair.  "Brent Mydland: Steppin' Out." The Golden Road, Issue 15, Fall 1987
 Official Grateful Dead Website

Grateful Dead members
1952 births
1990 deaths
American rock keyboardists
Musicians from the San Francisco Bay Area
Cocaine-related deaths in California
Deaths by heroin overdose in California
Drug-related deaths in California
Burials in Contra Costa County, California
People from Brentwood, California
20th-century American musicians
20th-century American singers
Bobby and the Midnites members
Go Ahead (band) members
20th-century American keyboardists
20th-century American male singers